"You and I" is a song written by Barry, Robin and Maurice Gibb and was recorded and performed by Kenny Rogers from his 1983 album Eyes That See in the Dark. Despite not being released as a single, it has been played on the radio, becoming one of Rogers' most popular songs. Barry Gibb sings background vocals on the intro, chorus, interlude (between the first chorus and second verse). The performer of the song sometimes credited to 'Kenny Rogers and the Bee Gees' because Barry used his falsetto.

"You and I" was recorded around May 1983, the Boneroo Horns was heard on the song's outro.

Personnel
 Kenny Rogers — vocals
 Barry Gibb — background vocals, guitar
 Maurice Gibb — guitar, bass, synthesizer
 Tim Renwick — guitar
 George Terry — guitar
 George Bitzer – piano, synthesizer
 Albhy Galuten — piano, synthesizer
 Ron Ziegler – drums
 Joe Lala — percussion
 Peter Graves — horns
 Whit Sidener – horns
 Ken Faulk – horns
 Neal Bonsanti – horns

Barry Gibb version
Barry Gibb's original version of "You and I" was the second song intended for Kenny Rogers' new album. Gibb's version was recorded in January 1983 in Miami Beach, Florida with "This Woman" and "Midsummer Nights". This version was released officially in 2006, 23 years after Gibb finished this song. This song followed the style of Gibb's own version of "Eyes That See in the Dark". Like he does on Rogers' version, he sings background vocals on the intro, first chorus interlude (between the first chorus and second verse) and the second chorus. Gibb's version was released on The Eyes That See in the Dark Demos.

Personnel
 Barry Gibb – lead and background vocals, guitar
 Albhy Galuten – piano, synthesizer

References

Songs written by Barry Gibb
Songs written by Robin Gibb
Songs written by Maurice Gibb
Song recordings produced by Barry Gibb
Kenny Rogers songs
1983 songs
Barry Gibb songs
Song recordings produced by Albhy Galuten